Those Whom the Gods Detest is the sixth studio album by American technical death metal band Nile. The album was released on November 3, 2009, in North America, and on November 6, 2009, in Europe through Nuclear Blast. It was produced and mixed by Neil Kernon, with Erik Rutan handling the drum recording. The album debuted at #160 on Billboard 200 list in United States.

The cover artwork, a depiction of the Egyptian Pharaoh Akhenaten, was brought to realization this time around by Michal "Xaay" Loranc, with whom Karl Sanders has previously worked on his second solo record Saurian Exorcisms.

According to a post on the band's message board, they were also planning to release a "making of" documentary covering the rehearsals, preproduction and studio sessions of the album. The documentary, called Making Things the Gods Detest was later released on October 30, 2010. Liner notes, written by Karl Sanders to explain the concept behind the songs, were featured in the album booklet for the first time since their 2005 album Annihilation of the Wicked.

As of September 24, 2009, the track "Permitting the Noble Dead to Descend to the Underworld" has been made available for streaming over MySpace Music. 

On October 28, 2010, the band released the official video for "Permitting the Noble Dead to Descend to the Underworld".

Critical reception 
Critical reception of this album has been relatively positive. Justin Norton from the website About.com, within the website's heavy metal subdivision, favorited Those Whom The Gods Detest as being one of their best albums to date. "Those Whom The Gods Detest is a career landmark packed with mind-boggling guitar riffs and solos, nonstop speed, George Kollias’ inimitable drumming and a sense of urgency some claimed was missing from their last effort. Death metal bands take note – Nile is back with a vengeance, much like Boris Karloff in the old Universal Mummy pictures."

Norton also noted that this album's name is anti-religious. "Frontman Karl Sanders says anger and rejection were parts of this album, and it shows. 'The concept is that all of us who play and listen to metal are the people that the gods hate. So [the new album] is a unified rejection of the gods - any god, every god,' Sanders says. 'Not any one in particular, but all of 'em.' If the album is meant to be a rejection of gods then it’s certain to unify metalheads in praise."

Track listing

Charts

Personnel

Nile
 Karl Sanders − guitars, vocals
 Dallas Toler-Wade − guitars, bass, vocals
 George Kollias − drums

Additional personnel
Mike Breazale, Chief Spires, David Meredith, Jon Vesano, Pete Hammoura − additional vocals

Production
Neil Kernon − production, mixing, engineering
Erik Rutan − engineering
Serdar Ozturk − assistant engineering
Alan Douches - mastering

External links
"Those Whom The Gods Detest" at discogs

References

2009 albums
Nile (band) albums
Nuclear Blast albums
Albums produced by Neil Kernon
Criticism of religion